John Papworth (1921–2020) is an English clergyman, writer and activist.

John Papworth is also the name of:

John Papworth (plasterer) (1750–1799), English plasterer and stuccoist 
John Buonarotti Papworth (1775–1847), English architect and artist
John Woody Papworth (1820–1870), English architect, designer and antiquary